The Particular Sadness of Lemon Cake is a 2010 novel by Aimee Bender. The story is about a young girl, Rose Edlestein, who has the ability to taste the emotions of a person through the food they make.

Plot 
The story begins before Rose's ninth birthday, when her mother, Lane, bakes her a cake for the occasion. Rose knows that Lane is unhappy with her life, but Lane's emotions show otherwise. From the looks of the way the cake was baked, Rose can tell that her mother feels oppressed. Once she realizes that she can taste emotions in the foods that she eats, she quickly comes to dislike it. Rose makes negative comments about the food she is consuming and Lane seems to think that she has done something wrong within her cooking. Rose's father, Paul, is oblivious to the fact that anything is going on per usual, and her brother thinks that his sister has gone insane.

Rose's brother whose name is Joseph has a friend named George. George is the only person who seems to think that Rose is not alright. He is very warmhearted towards Rose and designs an experiment to see how strong her abilities are. The conclusion of the experiment is that Rose is able to detect the emotion in the food she eats in those who cannot comprehend the emotions they are feeling themselves. One day Rose eats a pie that Lane baked and Rose collapses to the floor. Lane takes Rose to the hospital and Rose demands that they get rid of her mouth. Once the shock from what happened is gone. Rose then realizes that if she is to speak about her ability she will come off as insane.

Years go by and Rose has been able to avoid her mother's cooking, but by the age of 12 she decided to join the family dinner. In the roast beef she is able to feel a culmination of things such as, guilt, romance, and lust because Lane is having an affair, which she deduces to be with her co-worker, Larry. While Joseph is babysitting her, he seemingly disappears, to Rose's distress, only to reappear a few moments later outside his bedroom door. This happens again while babysitting a different time, and again when Lane, Rose, George, and Joseph are supposed to leave for his high school graduation. Joseph doesn't get into any of the colleges he applies to and, after some convincing, agrees to attend Los Angeles City College. He gets a nearby apartment with the help of his parents, where he lives alone. 

A few months later, when he neglects to call his mother at the scheduled time and is unreachable for a number of days, she goes to check on him and finds him face down on the floor in his kitchen, nearly unconscious. He is rushed to the hospital, where he is treated for, among other things, extreme dehydration. A couple years go by and Rose finds out that Joseph has disappeared again. She is asked by her mother to check on him after, while on a work vacation, she calls him and discovers his phone has been disconnected. She finds a bed sitting in the hallway outside of his door and breaks the chain latch on the door when he doesn't answer her knocks. All the lights in the apartment are out. She finds him in his bedroom, sitting on a chair in front of his laptop in the dark. She stays with him for a while, during which he repeatedly asks her to leave. She sees that the leg of his chair appears to disappear into his shoe, and while investigating this discovers that he is somehow metamorphosing his leg into leg of the chair that he was sitting on. She leaves the room momentarily to find the phone, and when she returns Joseph is gone.

Rose graduates high school and, rather than going to college, decides to stay home and take a job at an office. She finds a restaurant where the food tastes acceptable to her. The cook who makes the food is focused on the ingredients that are being used and how well the food tastes. Not long after, Rose gets a job as a dishwasher at the restaurant. One night, Rose sees that her father is looking at an old photo album. She sees that there is a piece of cloth tied over her grandfather's face in one of the pictures. She then proceeds to ask her father about it, and he says that his father wore it because he had the ability to smell other people's emotions so strongly that it was painful. When Rose opens up to her father about her own ability, he instantly believes her and tells her that he thinks that he himself has a similar skill, however he believes that he will only find out about it while in a hospital, so he avoids them at all costs. Paul feels as though the skill he possesses would be unbearable, as it was for his father. Rose realizes that the skills run in her family, and that her brothers skill might be something that is so unbearably awful, he must "disappear" from the world to escape it. Joseph eventually returns, again face down on the floor. In the hospital, she comforts him about it, and he reveals the reasoning behind the chair incident. The nature of his skill is never revealed.

Finally, Rose, decides to embrace the skill that she has been given to help people, and provide insight to the food in restaurants and training to be a chef at the restaurant where she worked as a dishwasher. She also helps a counselor gain insight into the minds of her teenage patients.

Publication history 
The Particular Sadness of Lemon Cake was first published hardback in June 2010 through Doubleday, alongside an e-book edition and audiobook narrated by the author. A paperback edition was released through Anchor Books the following April.

Reception 
Jane Ciabattari of NPR reviewed The Particular Sadness of Lemon Cake, calling it "high-hearted and soulful".

Anna Scott of The Guardian concluded it is a "quirky, engaging tale".

Susan Salter Reynolds of The Los Angeles Times also reviewed the work, concluding that it was "this century’s version of noir, or maybe it’s the opposite of noir", noting that "it’s about daily life that is increasingly impossible to navigate yet moving always forward."

References 

2010 American novels
Doubleday (publisher) books
Postmodern novels